Michiel Victor (28 May 1910 – 21 August 1998) was a South African sports shooter. He competed in the 300 metre rifle, three positions and 50 metre rifle, three positions events at the 1960 Summer Olympics.

References

1910 births
1998 deaths
People from Masilonyana Local Municipality
South African male sport shooters
Olympic shooters of South Africa
Shooters at the 1960 Summer Olympics
20th-century South African people